This is an incomplete list of Charles Darwin University people, including alumni and staff.

Notable alumni
Loraine Braham
James Burke
Sue Carter
Lia Finocchiaro
Michael Gunner
Lauren Moss
Chansey Paech

Administration

Chancellors

Vice-Chancellors

Faculty
Tim Berra
Keith Christian
Gail Garvey, epidemiological oncologist, Menzies School of Health
Yingiya Mark Guyula
Hugh Hickling
Jaquelyne Hughes, nephrologist
 Martin Jarvis, professor and lecturer of music
Clare Martin
Alan Powell
Helen Verran

References

Charles Darwin University
Charles Darwin University
Darwin, Northern Territory-related lists